Cleistanthus collinus is a plant species first described by Roxburgh, with its current name after Bentham and Hooker; it is included in the family Phyllanthaceae.  The IUCN categorizes this species as vulnerable.  No subspecies are listed in the Catalogue of Life.

Properties
Cleistanthus collinus (Karra) contains a plant poison also called oduvan (Tamil), kadise (Kannada), Vadisaku (Telugu), Oduku (Malayalam) and Gaja Madara (Sinhala) . Ingestion of its leaves or a decoction of its leaves causes hypokalemia (kaliuresis and cardiac arrhythmias), metabolic acidosis, hypotension and hypoxia probably due to distal renal tubular acidosis, ARDS and toxin induced vasodilatation respectively. Hypokalemia and acidosis probably also induces rhabdomyolysis resulting in myoglobinuric kidney failure and neuromuscular weakness. Its effects are probably mediated by injury to the distal renal tubules, pulmonary epithelium and peripheral blood vessels due to glutathione depletion (animal studies have shown benefit with N-acetylcysteine).

Gallery

References
 

 
 

collinus